A by-election was held for the New South Wales Legislative Assembly electorate of Queanbeyan on 24 November 1906 because the seat of Alan Millard was declared vacant because he was convicted of a felony, misappropriating  of a client's money.

Dates

Result

Alan Millard was expelled because he was convicted of a felony.

See also
Electoral results for the district of Queanbeyan
List of New South Wales state by-elections

Notes

References

1906 elections in Australia
New South Wales state by-elections
1900s in New South Wales